The Bloom and the Blight is the fourth full-length album from the band Two Gallants, released on September 4, 2012. It follows up their self-titled album, Two Gallants, which was released on September 25, 2007. A streaming version of the full album was made available on August 27, 2012, by Rolling Stone magazine.

Track listing
 "Halcyon Days"
 "Song of Songs"
 "My Love Won't Wait"
 "Broken Eyes"
 "Ride Away"
 "Decay"
 "Winter's Youth"
 "Willie"
 "Cradle Pyre"
 "Sunday Souvenirs"

References

2012 albums
Two Gallants (band) albums
ATO Records albums
Albums produced by John Congleton

gl:Two Gallants (álbum)